Paige Therese Satchell (born 13 April 1998) is a footballer from New Zealand, playing for Wellington Phoenix in the A-League Women. She has played for the New Zealand national team in the under-17, under-20, and senior levels. She was a travelling reserve for the New Zealand team at the 2016 Summer Olympics and was a squad member for New Zealand at the 2020 Summer Olympics.

Early life and education
Satchell is from Rotorua, New Zealand. Satchell has an older sister (Eillish) and three older step-siblings (Kayne, Lea, QJ). She first played football at age five. By age nine she was playing football for Ngongotaha AFC. She continued to play for the team through age 14. Satchell also excelled at running, winning a national title in her age group for cross country in 2011.
At age 17 she was a student at John Paul College.

Career
Satchell was a member of New Zealand's women's under-17 team for the 2014 Fifa Under-17 Women's World Cup. Satchell later played for the New Zealand national team in the under-20 division, including the 2016 Fifa Under-20 Women's World Cup.

Satchell has played football for Rotorua United. In 2015 she joined Three Kings United. She moved to Auckland to advance her football career. The following year, Satchell was selected to join the New Zealand national team, known as the Ferns, for friendly matches against Australia. She was a travelling reserve for the New Zealand team at the 2016 Summer Olympics. In a December 2016 match against Thailand, Satchell set up two goals and scored a third, helping New Zealand to a 3–1 victory.

On 17 April 2019, Satchell signed her first professional contract, signing with German club SC Sand in the Frauen-Bundesliga for the 2019–20 season.

In November 2020, Satchell joined Australian W-League club Canberra United.

In August 2021, following the 2020 Summer Olympics, Satchell joined W-League club Sydney FC.

In July 2022, following their inaugural season in the A-League Women, Satchell joined Wellington Phoenix.

International goals
Scores and results list New Zealand's goal tally first.

References

External links
 
 
 
 OFC statistics

1998 births
New Zealand women's association footballers
Expatriate women's footballers in Germany
Living people
Sportspeople from Rotorua
People educated at John Paul College, Rotorua
Women's association football forwards
2019 FIFA Women's World Cup players
New Zealand women's international footballers
SC Sand players
Canberra United FC players
Sydney FC (A-League Women) players
Wellington Phoenix FC (A-League Women) players
Frauen-Bundesliga players
A-League Women players
Footballers at the 2020 Summer Olympics
Olympic association footballers of New Zealand
New Zealand expatriate sportspeople in Germany
New Zealand expatriate women's association footballers
New Zealand expatriate sportspeople in Australia
Expatriate women's soccer players in Australia